commonly abbreviated as Nintendo SDD and formerly known as Nintendo Network Business & Development (NBD), Nintendo Network Service Development (NSD), and Nintendo Special Planning & Development (SPD), was a Japanese division located in the Nintendo Research Institute in Kyoto, Japan, until it moved to the Nintendo Development Center, also in Kyoto. The division consisted of a single development team that focused on software and peripheral development. SDD was composed of two development departments with different duties: the Network Development & Operations Department, which handled Nintendo Network service programming, in cooperation with Nintendo Network Service Database, and the Environment Development Department, which developed Software Development Kits (SDKs), among other technologies.

On September 16, 2015, SDD merged with Nintendo Integrated Research & Development (IRD), becoming the Nintendo Platform Technology Development.

History 
The Nintendo Special Planning & Development team originated from former Nintendo R&D2 staff, and was mainly responsible for ports and in-house development for low profile hardware, such as the Pokémon Mini and the Super Famicom Satellaview service. Most of the software developed by this group has remained domestic having hardly ever seen release outside Japan. The original general manager, Satoshi Yamato, produced all of the software which included in-house software for the Game Boy Advance, and the e-Reader. The group also created mechanical devices and peripherals like the Pokéwalker and Pokémotion. The last general manager, Masaru Shimomura described the Mechanical Design Group as a small creative unit that has a hardware and a software team working jointly together to create innovative products.

In 2008, Nintendo SPD was renamed to Nintendo Network Service Development. In 2011, the Nintendo NSD development team was consolidated into a division and was renamed to Nintendo Network Business & Development, appointing Masaru Shimomura as manager. Following the change, the Nintendo Network Business department was created. The department contained two different groups: the former Mechanical Design Group, which was responsible for developing software titles and peripherals, as well the new Network Planning Group, which was responsible for developing Nintendo Network services.

In 2013, the division renamed to Nintendo System Development Division. Nintendo consolidated the Network Planning Group into a department named Network Development & Operations Department which was responsible for handling Nintendo Network service programming in cooperation with Nintendo Network Service Database, and created the Environment Development Department', which developed Software Development Kits (SDKs), among experimental technologies. With the change, the Mechanical Design Group was dissolved.

On September 16, 2015, SDD merged with Nintendo Integrated Research & Development (IRD), becoming the Nintendo Platform Technology Development.

Network Operations & Development Department 
Department Manager: Kiyoshi Mizuki

The Network Operations & Development Department was responsible for developing Nintendo Network services, in cooperation with the Nintendo Network Service Database. The department had two subgroups: the Network Software Development Group and the Application Group.

Notes

Environment Development Department 
The Environment Development Department was responsible for developing online communication infrastructures and middleware tools.

Mechanical Design Group 
Manager/Producer:

The Mechanical Design Group was responsible for developing software titles and peripherals for Nintendo video game consoles, until it was dissolved in 2013.

Discography Credits

Notes

References

Nintendo divisions and subsidiaries
Defunct video game companies of Japan
Video game companies established in 1997
Video game companies disestablished in 2015
Video game development companies
First-party video game developers
Companies based in Kyoto Prefecture
Japanese companies disestablished in 2015
Japanese companies established in 1997